Maslo is a surname. Notable people with the surname include:

 Ján Maslo (born 1986), Slovak footballer
 Peter Maslo (born 1987), Slovak footballer
 Uli Maslo (born 1938), German footballer and manager

See also
 Maslov
 Maslow (disambiguation)